Lucien Tostain (10 December 1909 – 11 January 1992) was a French long-distance runner. He competed in the men's 10,000 metres at the 1936 Summer Olympics.

References

External links
 

1909 births
1992 deaths
Athletes (track and field) at the 1936 Summer Olympics
French male long-distance runners
Olympic athletes of France